Ljutenica, lyutenitsa or lutenica (lyuto or luto meaning "hot") is a (sometimes spicy) vegetable relish or chutney in Bulgarian, Macedonian and Serbian cuisines.

The ingredients include peppers, aubergines, carrots, garlic, vegetable oil, sugar, salt, and tomatoes. It comes in many varieties: smooth; chunky; with chili peppers or eggplant; and hot or mild.

In recent years, industrial production of ljutenica and ajvar has flourished. Large-scale production of both relishes has popularized them outside the Balkans.

See also

 Ajvar
 Pindjur, like ljutenica and ajvar but with eggplant (aubergine)
 Zacuscă, a similar vegetable spread in Romania
 Kyopolou, an eggplant-based relish in Bulgarian and Turkish cuisines
 Biber salçası, a Turkish spread made from red peppers alone
 Chushkopek, literally meaning "pepper roaster", an appliance used to prepare peppers for their use in ljutenica
 List of dips
 List of sauces
 List of spreads

References

Bulgarian cuisine
Chili pepper dishes
Chutney
Macedonian cuisine
Serbian cuisine